The 2016 United States House of Representatives election in Alaska was held on November 8, 2016, to elect the U.S. representative from Alaska's at-large congressional district, who will represent the state of Alaska in the 114th United States Congress. The election coincided with the 2016 U.S. presidential election, as well as other elections to the House of Representatives, elections to the United States Senate and various state and local elections.

Incumbent Republican U.S. Representative Don Young was re-elected to a twenty-third term in office.

Republican primary

Candidates

Declared
Gerald Heikes, minister at Anchorage's nondenominational Bethel Chapel and perennial candidate
Jesse Tingley
Stephen Wright, US Air Force veteran
Don Young, incumbent U.S. Representative

Declined
Mike Dunleavy, state senator
Lance Pruitt, state representative
Sean Parnell, former governor of Alaska, and candidate for US House in 2008
Joe Miller, former magistrate judge, nominee for the U.S. Senate in 2010 and candidate for the U.S. Senate in 2014
Mead Treadwell, former lieutenant governor and candidate for the U.S. Senate in 2014

Results

Democratic–Libertarian–Independence primary
Candidates from the Alaska Democratic Party, Alaska Libertarian Party and Alaskan Independence Party appear on the same ballot, with the highest-placed candidate from each party receiving that party's nomination.

Democratic

Candidates

Declared
William Hibler, former glaciologist with the University of Alaska Fairbanks
Steve Lindbeck, former CEO of Alaska Public Media
Lynette Moreno-Hinz, taxicab driver, candidate for Lieutenant Governor in 2010 and candidate for the State House in 2012

Declined
Mark Begich, former U.S. Senator

Libertarian

Candidates

Declared
Jim McDermott
Jon Watts

Endorsements

Results

General election

Fundraising

Predictions

Polling

Results

References

External links
Division of Elections at Alaska Government
Alaska U.S. House at OurCampaigns.com
United States House of Representatives elections in Alaska, 2016 at Ballotpedia
Outside spending at the Sunlight Foundation

Official campaign websites
Steve Lindbeck for Congress (D)
Don Young for Congress (R)

United States House of Representatives
Alaska
2016